Winifred Peck, née Knox, (1882–1962) was an English novelist and biographer.

Biography 
Winifred Frances Knox was born in Headington, England in 1882. Her father was Edmund Arbuthnott Knox, the fourth Bishop of Manchester. Knox was one of the first 40 pupils to attend Wycombe Abbey School, and she went on to read Modern History at Lady Margaret Hall, Oxford.

Knox's first book, written in 1909, was a biography of Louis IX. In 1911 she married James Peck, a British civil servant,.

Ten years after writing her first book, Winifred Peck began a novel-writing career which saw the publication of twenty-five books over a period of forty years, including House-bound (1942), which was reprinted in 2007 by Persephone Books. She also wrote two books on the subject of her own childhood, A Little Learning (1952) and Home for the Holidays (1955).

Peck had three sons (the second predeceased his parents), and when her husband was awarded a knighthood in 1938 she assumed the title of Lady Peck.

Peck was the sister of E. V. Knox, editor of Punch; Ronald Knox, theologian and writer; Dilly Knox, cryptographer; Wilfred Lawrence Knox, clergyman; and Ethel Knox. Her niece was the Booker Prize-winning author Penelope Fitzgerald who wrote a biography of her father, E. V. Knox, and her uncles, entitled The Knox Brothers.

Lady Peck died on 20 November 1962.

Books
In her Who's Who entry, Peck listed the following books by her:

The Court of a Saint, 1909
Twelve Birthdays, 1918
The Closing Gates, 1922
A Patchwork Tale, 1925 
The King of Melido, 1927
A Change of Master, 1928
The Warrielaw Jewel, 1933
The Skirts of Time, 1935
The Skies are Falling, 1936
They Come, They Go, 1937
Coming Out, 1938
Let Me Go Back, 1940
Bewildering Cares, 1940

A Garden Enclosed, 1941
Housebound, 1942
Tranquillity, 1943
There is a Fortress, 1945
Through Eastern Windows, 1947
Veiled Destinies, 1948
Arrest the Bishop, 1949
A Clear Dawn, 1949
Facing South, 1950
Unseen Array, 1951
Winding Ways, 1952
A Little Learning, 1952
Home for the Holidays, 1955

Notes and references
Notes

References

External links

Author Profile at Persephone Books
House-Bound at Persephone Books

1882 births
1962 deaths
20th-century British novelists
Alumni of Lady Margaret Hall, Oxford
British biographers
20th-century biographers